Halaria is a town and former Rajput non-salute princely state on Saurashtra peninsula, in Gujarat, western India.

History
The petty princely state, in Sorath prant, was ruled by Kathi Chieftains.

It comprised four villages, with a population of 1,268 in 1901, yielding 12,500 Rupees state revenue (1903–04, mostly from land), paying 179 Rupees tribute, to the Gaikwar Baroda State and Junagadh State.

References

External links
 Imperial Gazetteer, on DSAL.UChicago.edu - Kathiawar

Princely states of Gujarat